Cordill is a surname. Notable people with the surname include:

Charles C. Cordill (1845–1916), American cotton planter and politician
Olie Cordill (1916–1988), American football player

See also
Cogdill